Greek singer Demis Roussos was a prolific recording artist who sang in a number of languages and during the course of his career made at least 293 recordings including 38 albums, 154 singles and EPs, 92 compilations and one DVD.

Albums 
For the discography with the band Aphrodite's Child, see Aphrodite's Child#Discography.

Studio albums 

"N/A" means that the chart in its current version was established later and the data from that time are incompatible/unavailable.
* Charted posthumously in 2015 after his death

Live albums

Compilation albums 

"N/A" means that the chart in its current version was established later and the data from that time are incompatible/unavailable.
* Charted posthumously in 2015

More selected compilations (not present in the table)
1992: The Complete Collection
2010: Demis Collection

2016: Demis Roussos Complete

Extended plays

Singles 
The list is incomplete.

"N/A" means that the chart in its current version was established later and the data from that time are incompatible/unavailable.
* Charted posthumously in 2015 after his death
** Remakes of old Aphrodite's Child hits from the double album The Story of Demis Roussos. The singles were released on BR Music. "Rain and Tears" was recorded live during "Goud van Oud Live" on April 10, 1987 in Rosmalen. "Marie Jolie" and "It's Five O'Clock" were studio recordings.

Collaboration singles

References

External links 
 Demis Roussos at AllMusic
 
 

Discography
Discographies of Greek artists
Pop music discographies